Bruno Gunn (born November 8, 1968) is an American actor. He is best known for playing Brutus in The Hunger Games: Catching Fire and Walrus on HBO's Westworld.

Life and career
Gunn started his acting career 1997, with a cameo in the Comedy Central series Pulp Comedy. He later appeared in the television series Haunted, Deep Cover, Oz, Late Night with Conan O'Brien, Law & Order: Special Victims Unit, Fastlane and Buffy the Vampire Slayer. Gunn appeared also in the Television films Recipe for Disaster, Mending Fences and Edgar Floats. As well played minor roles in the films Celebrity, Mickey Blue Eyes , Oxygen, 28 Days, Herbie: Fully Loaded, Hotel California, Officer Downe, and Bad Teacher.

References

External links

1968 births
Living people
21st-century American male actors
American male film actors
Male actors from Ohio
Actors from Canton, Ohio